Schlicher is a surname. Notable people with the surname include:

Nathan Schlicher (born 1982), American politician
Ronald L. Schlicher (1956–2019), American diplomat

See also
George F. Schlicher Hotel
Schleicher (surname)